Gary G. Dahl (born December 5, 1940) is a former Republican member of the Illinois Senate, representing the 38th district from 2005 until his December 2010 resignation for personal reasons.

In 2009, Senator Dahl was the chief sponsor behind a resolution in the Illinois Senate to officially recognize Pluto as a planet and to declare March 13, 2009 as "Pluto Day" in the State.
Legislative priorities:
•	Restore fiscal discipline to Illinois and tackle the budget crisis
•	Bring more high quality, good paying jobs to the 38th District
•	Reform Illinois ethics laws and enhance sunshine of state government.

Legislative assignments
Committees on Agriculture and Conservation; Commerce and Economic Development; Licensed Activities; State Government and Veterans Affairs

Career
Small business owner – President of the Double D Express Inc., Double D Warehouse LLC, based in Peru, Illinois which Dahl founded in 1985.

U.S. Army Veteran (1958–1962)

Community involvement
Gary has been a member of numerous community organizations, including the Illinois Valley Red Cross (board member for six years), Illinois Valley Area Chamber of Commerce (two-time president), Meals on Wheels volunteer, Habitat for Humanity Foundation Board, the Illinois Valley Animal Rescue, the Peru Rotary and the Junior Achievement Board.
As a small business owner, Gary also belongs to several groups connected to his work, including the National Federation of Independent Business, the Mid-West Truckers Association, Illinois Chamber of Commerce, the Illinois Trucking Association and the American Trucking Association. He also served as treasurer of the Distribution & LTL Carriers Association.

Awards
Red Cross’s Prairie State Good Neighbor Award (2004), Peru Rotary Community Service Award (1993), Rotarian of the Year (2003), Junior Achievement Award (2003), Innovative Solutions Workforce Development program (2000), Jimmy Carter Humanitarian Award (2000), Horizon House Appreciation Award (2003) .

Personal
Dahl is married to Debbie, father of five children, two stepchildren and 14 grandchildren. He currently lives in rural Granville.

News
Senator Dahl tendered his resignation on December 2, 2010 stating he wants to spend more time with family; he was replaced by Sue Rezin of Morris, Illinois.

References

External links
Senator Gary Dahl official website
Illinois General Assembly - Senator Gary G. Dahl (R) 38th District official IL Senate website
Bills, Committees
Follow the Money - Gary G. Dahl
2006 2004 campaign contributions
Project Vote Smart - Senator Gary G. Dahl (IL) profile
Illinois State Senate Republicans - Dan Cronin profile
Double D Express Web site

1940 births
Living people
Republican Party Illinois state senators
People from Granville, Illinois
People from Lake Mills, Iowa
Military personnel from Iowa
Businesspeople from Illinois
21st-century American politicians